Bazaria polichomriella is a species of snout moth in the genus Bazaria. It was described by Hans Georg Amsel in 1970. It is found in Afghanistan.

References

Phycitini
Moths described in 1970
Moths of Asia